Parkwood may refer to:

Places
Australia
 Parkwood, Western Australia, a suburb of Perth
 Parkwood, Queensland

Canada
 Parkwood, Ontario, a community in Greater Sudbury

England
 Park Wood, Maidstone, Maidstone, Kent
 Park Wood, Medway, a suburban area of Rainham, Kent in the unitary authority of Medway.
 Parkwood, Kent, a woodland wildlife and recreation area near Tenterden, Kent.

Ireland
 Parkwood, County Offaly, a townland in Kilcumreragh civil parish, barony of Kilcoursey, County Offaly

South Africa
 Parkwood, Johannesburg

United States
 Parkwood, California, a census-designated place in Madera County
 Parkwood, Washington, a census-designated place in Kitsap County
 Parkwood (Decatur), a neighborhood in Decatur, Georgia
 Parkwood, Louisville, a neighborhood in Louisville, Kentucky
 Parkwood, Philadelphia, a neighborhood in Philadelphia, Pennsylvania

Organisations
 Parkwood (bandy club), United States
 Parkwood Christian Academy (Lilburn, Georgia), United States
 Parkwood University, a University Degree Program diploma mill
 Parkwood Secondary College, Ringwood North, Victoria, Australia

See also
 Parkwood E-ACT Academy, Sheffield, England
 Parkwood Estate, Oshawa, Ontario
 Parkwood High School, Monroe, North Carolina
 Parkwood Entertainment, Beyoncé's management and entertainment company
 Chevrolet Parkwood, a station wagon manufactured from 1959 to 1961